Theodorus Jozef Franciscus Marie "Theo" Bovens (born 1 October 1959) is a Dutch politician who served as the King's Commissioner of Limburg from 30 June 2011 until 19 April 2021. He has been acting mayor of Enschede since 2 October 2021.

A member of the Christian Democratic Appeal, he was a member of the municipal council of Maastricht from 1986 to 2002 and served as one of the city's aldermen from 1994 to 2003. From 2003 to 2005 he was Vice Chairman of the Open University in the Netherlands and from 2005 until 2011 he served as chairman. From 2006 to 2011 he was also a member of the Social-Economic Council.

Bovens was born in Maastricht and studied history at Radboud University Nijmegen. He is married and has a daughter.

Honours and awards
: Knight of the Order of Orange-Nassau
: Knight of the Order of the Holy Sepulchre (14 April 2007)

References 
  Parlement.com biography

1959 births
Living people
20th-century Dutch politicians
21st-century Dutch politicians
Aldermen in Limburg (Netherlands)
Christian Democratic Appeal politicians
Dutch Roman Catholics
King's and Queen's Commissioners of Limburg
Knights of the Holy Sepulchre
Mayors of Enschede
Municipal councillors of Maastricht
Politicians from Maastricht
Radboud University Nijmegen alumni